Mark Gazit is an expert on cyber security, Artificial Intelligence, financial technology, and big data. A business executive and serial entrepreneur,  Gazit today serves as President and CEO of ThetaRay.

Life and education
Gazit studied computer science and mathematics at Hebrew University and senior business administration at Tel Aviv University.   He also attended the YPO executive management studies at Harvard Business School.

Business activities 
From 1993 to 1995, Gazit worked as a computer consultant. In 1995, he co-founded NetMedia, which was sold to NetVision in 1996. At NetVision, Gazit served as an executive vice president of technology and infrastructure and a deputy CEO. In May 2000, he joined Deltathree Ltd. as CEO and Deltathree Inc. as corporate executive vice president. In 2003, Gazit joined SkyVision, a global provider of secure communications, as president and group CEO. Later he served as managing director of NICE Cyber and Intelligence Solutions.

In 2013, Gazit joined ThetaRay, a big data analytics and fintech software company, as CEO.

Today, Gazit also serves on numerous industry boards, including as Chairman of the Public Board for Cyber for the Israeli Export & International Cooperation Institute (IEICI), a member of the Technology Board of the Monetary Authority of Singapore, and board member of the Israeli American Chamber of Commerce.

References 

Year of birth missing (living people)
Living people

Security experts